Alexey Ivanovich Podberezkin (also: Podberyozkin; ; born 7 February 1953) is a Russian politician, PhD in historical sciences, professor, member of Russian Academy of Sciences, member of Russian Academy of Military Sciences, president of the Russian-American University.

Biography 
Podberezkin was born on 7 February 1953 in Moscow into a family of workers. He graduated from Moscow State Institute of International Relations in 1979 with a degree in International relations. In 1982, Alexey Podberezkin got his Advance Degree in military-political problems and international relations and gained reputation as an expert in USA military politics.

Since 1981 to 1985, headed a group of consultants of the USSR Committee of Youth Organizations. In 1990, Podberezkin received Ph.D. in history. 
In 1994, founded the socio-political movement Spiritual Heritage, actively supporting the development of Russian science, culture, education and entrepreneurship. He featured communist and nationalist views, but in a relatively mild way.

Since 1995 to 99, he was a deputy of the Russian State Duma Federal Assembly of the 2nd convocation. In 2000 he ran for Russia's presidency. In 2005-2008, Podberezkin becomes a secretary general of the Socialist United Party of Russia (SEPR). In 2008, he became chairman adviser of the Accounting Chamber of the Russian Federation.

References 
 http://old.nasled.ru/
 "Moscow State Institute of International Affairs: http://www.mgimo.ru/users/document2088.phtml". Durham University. Retrieved 8 September 2011.

External links
 http://www.organizmica.org/archive/008/ac-structure.shtml
 https://web.archive.org/web/20160303231641/http://persona.rin.ru/eng/view/f//19608/podberyozkin-alexey

1953 births
Living people
Politicians from Moscow
Moscow State Institute of International Relations alumni
Podberezkin
Second convocation members of the State Duma (Russian Federation)